Greenstone Mountain Provincial Park is a provincial park in British Columbia, Canada, located south of Kamloops Lake on the northern edge of the Thompson Plateau.

References
BC Parks page

Provincial parks of British Columbia
Thompson Country
1997 establishments in British Columbia
Protected areas established in 1997